The following is a list of cities in Finland. In the year 1977, the legal difference between towns and municipalities was removed. Today they are all classified as municipalities, some of which are commonly referred to as cities (kaupunki in Finnish, stad in Swedish). A municipality can decide whether it calls itself a municipality or a city. 

 but suurkaupunki (~ large town) is used for a few cities in Finland. This fits the EU's definition of a city, which has the criteria of a minimum population of 50,000 and a minimum population density of 500 inhabitants per square kilometer. A simple, independent decision in the municipal council is sufficient to call a municipality (kunta) a city (kaupunki). For cities founded before the 1960s, the list includes the year the city was chartered.

Many municipal mergers have been carried out in Finland (and more are yet to come, due to a countrywide municipal reform). Mergers also make it difficult to define what towns are cities because mergers make the population increase a bit but make the population density decrease. For example, according to the EU definition, Tampere is no longer a city, due to the municipal mergers with Messukylä, Aitolahti, and Teisko, which decreased its official population density to 410.5 inhabitants per square kilometer, as of 1 July 2012. In Finland, the whole area inside a municipality's borders is officially considered the city or town area. 

The names used in this encyclopedia are usually the Finnish or Swedish forms, depending on the majority language of the municipality, except when there is a commonly used English name.

Cities (founded)

See also 
List of cities
List of urban areas in Finland by population

Notes

References

External links

Finland
 
Finland
Cities and towns